The 1940 Minnesota lieutenant gubernatorial election took place on November 5, 1940. Incumbent Lieutenant Governor C. Elmer Anderson of the Republican Party of Minnesota defeated Minnesota Farmer–Labor Party challenger Howard Y. Williams and Minnesota Democratic Party candidate Frank Patrick Ryan.

Results

External links
 Election Returns

Lieutenant Gubernatorial
1940

Minnesota